The light section is a technology for optical 3-D measurement, which makes the measurement of a height profile along a projected line of light.  It is based on the principle of triangulation.

References

Laser applications